Patrick John Keeling is a biologist and professor in the Department of Botany at the University of British Columbia. His research investigates the phylogeny, genomics and molecular evolution of protists and his work has led to numerous advances in assembling the eukaryotic tree of life. He has also identified several cases of horizontal gene transfer.

References

Protistologists
Evolutionary biologists
Canadian molecular biologists
Academic staff of the University of British Columbia
Living people
Fellows of the American Association for the Advancement of Science
1969 births